Arandric Kornell "Ran" Carthon (born February 10, 1981), is an American football executive and former player who is the general manager of the Tennessee Titans of the National Football League (NFL). He previously served as an executive for the San Francisco 49ers, St. Louis / Los Angeles Rams,  and Atlanta Falcons.

Carthon played running back for the University of Florida and signed as an undrafted free agent with the Indianapolis Colts in 2004. He played for three seasons in the NFL with the Colts and Detroit Lions.

Early years 

Carthon was born in Osceola, Arkansas.  His father is former NFL running back Maurice Carthon.  He attended Key West High School in Key West, Florida, and played for the Key West Conchs high school football team.  As a junior, he rushed for over 1,300 yards; as a senior, he rushed for over 500 yards and was named to PrepStar's All-Region team, despite missing seven games with an ankle injury.

Playing career

College
Carthon accepted an athletic scholarship to attend the University of Florida in Gainesville, Florida, where he played for coach Steve Spurrier and coach Ron Zook's Florida Gators football teams from 2000 to 2003.  As a senior in 2003, he was the leading rusher for the Gators.  Carthon is a member of Phi Beta Sigma fraternity.

After his NFL career was over, he returned to Gainesville, and graduated from the University of Florida with a bachelor's degree in sociology in 2008.

National Football League

Indianapolis Colts

Detroit Lions
Carthon finished his career with the Detroit Lions during the second half of the 2006 season.

Executive career

Atlanta Falcons
After retiring, Carthon was hired by the Atlanta Falcons as a pro scout in 2008. He spent the next four seasons in Atlanta.

St. Louis / Los Angeles Rams
In 2012, Carthon was hired by the St. Louis Rams as their director of player personnel.

San Francisco 49ers
In 2017, Carthon was hired by the San Francisco 49ers as their director of pro personnel. In 2021, Carthon was promoted to director of player personnel.

Tennessee Titans
On January 18, 2023, Carthon was hired by the Tennessee Titans as their general manager.

See also 

 History of the Indianapolis Colts
 List of University of Florida alumni

References

External links
 Tennessee Titans profile

1981 births
Living people
American football running backs
Atlanta Falcons scouts 
Detroit Lions players
Florida Gators football players
Indianapolis Colts players
Los Angeles Rams executives
National Football League general managers
People from Key West, Florida
People from Osceola, Arkansas
San Francisco 49ers executives
St. Louis Rams executives
Tennessee Titans executives